Reichelsheim is the name of two communes in Hesse, Germany

Reichelsheim (Wetterau)
Reichelsheim (Odenwald)